Men's Premiership Trophy: C L Abbott Shield (1924- )

Men's Minor Premiership Trophy: Chisholm Trophy (1963- )

Women's Premiership Trophy: Rowley Shield (1962- )

* Unofficial competition – South Australian Lacrosse Association not formed until 1888

† Unofficial competition – South Australian Lacrosse Association in recess during height of Second World War

Premierships by Club

* defunct club

‡1 does not include 2 unofficial men's premierships before formation of SA Lacrosse Association

‡2 does not include 1 unofficial men's premiership before formation of SA Lacrosse Association

‡3 does not include 2 unofficial men's premierships during Second World War

‡4 does not include 1 unofficial men's premiership during Second World War

‡5 does not include 1 unofficial men's premiership during Second World War

See also

Lacrosse in Australia

References

South Australia
South Australia
Lacrosse
Lacrosse
Lacrosse